Delus Keith Johnson (born October 28, 1965) is an American politician. He was a member of the Missouri House of Representatives from the 9th District, serving from 2010 to 2019, a member of the Republican Party. As of 2022, he is running for Missouri Senate District 12.

References

Living people
1965 births
Republican Party members of the Missouri House of Representatives
Place of birth missing (living people)
21st-century American politicians